Panthiades ochus is a butterfly in the family Lycaenidae. It was described by Frederick DuCane Godman and Osbert Salvin in 1887. It is found in Mexico and Guatemala.

References

Butterflies described in 1887
Eumaeini
Lycaenidae of South America
Taxa named by Frederick DuCane Godman
Taxa named by Osbert Salvin